Methionine-R-sulfoxide reductase B2, mitochondrial is an enzyme that in humans is encoded by the MSRB2 gene. The MRSB2 enzyme catalyzes the reduction of methionine sulfoxide to methionine.

See also
MSRA (gene)
Methionine oxidation
SEPX1

References

Further reading